Aleurocystidiellum is a fungal genus of uncertain familial placement in the order Russulales. The type species, Aleurocystidiellum subcruentatum is a crust fungus that was first described in 1860 by Miles Berkeley and Moses Ashley Curtis. Aleurocystidiellum was circumscribed by Paul Arenz Lemke in 1964.

References

Russulales
Russulales genera